Rainy refers to an abundance of rain. 

Rainy may also refer to:

Rainy season, a specific time of year with when most of a region's average annual rainfall

Places
Rainy Butte, a summit in North Dakota
Rainy Lake (disambiguation)
Rainy River (disambiguation)

See also
Rainy Day (disambiguation)